Alexandre Djouhri (born 18 February 1959) is a French businessman. In 1981 Djouhri was accused of armed robbery of a jewelry store but was later proven innocent .

Djouhri lives in Geneva, Switzerland, where he is on the board of a directors of a water treatment and alternative energy company. Les Échos has described him as a longtime, "important intermediary" in French foreign relations with North Africa.

In the 1990s, Djouhri became an associate of Michel Roussin and, through him, met Jacques Chirac. He was later a confidante of Nicolas Sarkozy and was arrested for questioning over allegations of Libyan influence in the 2007 French elections.
He participated in the release of Bulgarian nurses.

References

1959 births
Living people
French corporate directors
French people of Algerian descent
Businesspeople from Geneva